(21 February 1949 – 21 April 2016) was a Japanese composer born in Yamagata Prefecture, Japan.

Biography 
First, he studied engineering. He interrupted this to study music. He graduated from the Kanagawa University and took the Yamaha Band Director course, going on to do his major in technology. He also studied music composition under Bin Kanade and jazz theory under Makoto Uchibori. He graduated in 1971 and went on to play trombone in jazz and pop bands. He then worked as an assistant to Naohiro Iwai and began to focus on making compositions for bands.

His own works, especially for bands, are published in Europe and sold in America. Lately, he has also composed for TV series and movies. He served as an instructor of the Institute of Education, Sobi, as well as working as a special instructor at the Yamaha Music School.

He won an award in the composition section of the 7th Academic Society of Japan for Winds and Percussion bands competition.

Mashima died at the age of 67, due to cancer, on 21 April 2016.

Works

Work for Wind 
 1992 A Prelude to Applause
 1997 Mirage à Paris
 St. Germain des Pres
 La Fontaine de Medicis (Jardin du Luxembourg)
 Montmartre Place du Tertre-Sacre Coeur
 1997 Jacob's Ladder To a Crescent
 1998 Yosakoi
 1999 The Glowing Sun Appeared on the Horizon
 2000 Les Gens du Nord
 2000 Iroha
 Theme Largo
 1st Variation Allegro
 2nd Variation Adagio
 3rd Variation and Finale Presto
 2000–2001 Les trois notes du Japon
 La danse des grues (Tanz der Kraniche)
 La rivière enneigée (Der Fluß im Schnee)
 La fête du feu (Feuerfest)
 2001 Quiet Sunset
 2003 Mirage III
 Tune Up 
 Something Blue 
 After Hour
 2003 Naval Bleu
 2004 Deux Belles Ailes
 A Rainbow over Misty Mountain
 A Season in the Bloom of Cherry Blossoms
 A Tribute to the Count Basie Orchestra
 Jumpin' at the Woodside
 April in Paris (1932)
 Lil' Darlin (195
 Anohi-kiita-uta Folk Medley
 At The Mambo Inn
 Bay Breeze
 Carpenters Forever
 Dream in the Silent Night
 Five Okinawa Songs for Band
 Gelato con Caffee Samba
 March Spirit for Wind Orchestra
 2014 Mount Fuji: La musique inspirée de l'estampe de Hokusai
 Sousa's Holiday-The Thunderer - Samba 
 Sousa's Holiday-The Stars and Stripes Forever - Jazz
 Sweet Breeze in May Concert-March
 Takarajima
 Twilight in Central Park Ballad
 View with a Glimpes of Waves
 Welcome Rock Melody

Chamber music 
 1995 Urban Suite
 Twilight
 Station　
 Day Dream　
 City Light
 2000 Spinning Spiral for four Trombones
 Allegro
 Adagio
 Allegro maestoso
 2004 Conversation IV for two Snare Drums, four Tom-toms, Bass Drum, four Timpanis, Cymbals, Suspended Cymbal, Tam-tam, Castanets, two Wood Blocks, five Temple Blocks, Bongo, Triangle, Wind Chimes, Cabasa, Crotales(Opt.), Glockenspiel, Xylophone, Vibraphone, Marimba, Chimes
 2004 La Seine for Clarinet-Choir
 Pont Neuf
 Pont Mirabeau
 Pont Alexandre III
 A Spring Morning for Euphonium
 Rhapsody for Euphonium
 Cafe St Germain for Saxophone-Quartet

Work for Big Band/Jazz-Ensemble 
 Cat Race
 Morning Mist
 Pacific Coast Highway
 Samba nautica

References

External links
  

1949 births
2016 deaths
Japanese composers
Japanese male composers
Kanagawa University alumni
Musicians from Yamagata Prefecture
People from Yamagata Prefecture